The Old Grey Hare is a 1944 Merrie Melodies cartoon directed by Bob Clampett. The short was released on October 28, 1944, and features Bugs Bunny and Elmer Fudd.

Title
The title is a double play on words. One is the typical pun between "hare" and "hair", with the bunny (who was already grey-haired) rendered "old and grey" for this cartoon. The title also refers to the old song, "The Old Gray Mare". Some of the lobby cards for this cartoon gave the alternate spelling, The Old Gray Hare.

Plot
The cartoon starts with Elmer Fudd sitting under a tree, crying over his failure to catch Bugs. The "voice of God" tells Elmer to keep trying to catch him. Elmer wonders how long it will take and is shown exactly how long by being transported "far into the future" past the years 1950, 1960, 1970, 1980, 1990, until reaching the then-distant year of A.D. 2000, after the sound of the gong.

This offers the chance to use some contemporary gags with a futuristic twist, as Elmer finds a year 2000 newspaper called The Daily Rocket. The front page reads, "Bing Crosby's Horse Hasn't Come In Yet!" (Crosby was known for investing in racehorses that did poorly). Another article says, "Smellevision Replaces Television: Carl Stalling Sez It Will Never Work!" Yet another article, not mentioned by Elmer, states, "Quintuplets Give Birth To Quintuplets."

By now, both Elmer and Bugs are very old and wrinkled ("What's up, prune-face", "Not so fast, there, Grandpa!")—Bugs even has a large white beard, a cane, and lumbago—but their chase resumes. This time, Elmer is armed with an "original Buck Rogers lightning-quick rabbit killer" gun (with a powerful recoil). After a short chase, at slow speed, due to their ages, Elmer gets the upper hand, shooting Bugs with his ultra-modern weapon, with added Pinball effects and "TILT".

At the moment when it seems Elmer has finally beaten his nemesis, the apparently dying Bugs thinks back to when he and Elmer were much younger. This leads to a flashback sequence with a baby Elmer hunting a baby Bugs—both are still in diapers; Bugs is drinking carrot juice from a baby bottle; Elmer is crawling and toting a pop-gun; and they interrupt their chase to briefly take a baby nap-time together.

After the flashback is over, a tearful Bugs starts to dig his own grave, with Elmer getting equally emotional, but Bugs switches places with the weeping and distracted Elmer and cheerfully buries him alive instead. Elmer quips, "that pesky wabbit is out of my life forever and ever!" However, Bugs suddenly pops in and repeats the popular catchphrase of the "Richard Q. Peavey" character from The Great Gildersleeve, "Well, now, I wouldn't say that," plants a kiss on a startled Elmer, then hands him a large firecracker, lights the fuse and quickly departs as the screen immediately fades to black with the firecracker still hissing. The pre-written "That's all, Folks!" card appears, and the firecracker blows up in a tremendous explosion off-screen, rumbling and shaking the title card, leaving Elmer's fate unknown, but presumably dead.

Reception
Animation historian Greg Ford writes, "In the last two or three years before Robert Clampett abruptly left the Warner Bros. cartoon studio in the mid 1940s, the renegade director surrendered an unwieldy bunch of late-blooming, oddly self-reflexive masterworks. Clampett's craving for summation reaches epochal proportions in The Old Grey Hare, as Elmer is fast-forwarded all the way to the year 2000 (gasp!). So comically premature is Clampett's yen for retrospection that he essays a cradle-to-grave biopic of Bugs Bunny and Elmer Fudd, reminiscing over their longstanding relationship, even though the pair had only existed onscreen for about four years at the time."

Home media
VHS – Viddy-Oh! For Kids Cartoon Festivals: Bugs Bunny Cartoon Festival Featuring "Little Red Riding Rabbit"
VHS – Viddy-Oh! For Kids Cartoon Festivals: Bugs Bunny and Elmer Fudd Cartoon Festival Featuring "Wabbit Twouble"
LaserDisc – The Golden Age of Looney Tunes, Vol. 1, Side 10: The Art of Bugs
VHS – The Golden Age of Looney Tunes, Vol. 10: The Art of Bugs
VHS – Looney Tunes: The Collectors Edition Volume 7: Welcome To Wackyland
VHS – Bugs Bunny Superstar
DVD – Looney Tunes Golden Collection: Volume 4, Disc 2 (Bugs Bunny Superstar, Part 2) (Associated Artists Productions print)
DVD – Looney Tunes Golden Collection: Volume 5, Disc 3
DVD – The Essential Bugs Bunny, Disc 1
Blu-ray, DVD – Looney Tunes Platinum Collection: Volume 1, Disc 1
Blu-ray - Bugs Bunny 80th Anniversary Collection

Censorship
 When this cartoon aired on The WB, the part where baby Elmer points his toy gun at baby Bugs' face and baby Bugs cracks his bottle of carrot juice over baby Elmer's head was cut.

See also
Baby Looney Tunes

References

External links
 
 The Old Grey Hare at Big Cartoon Database

 

1944 films
1944 short films
1944 animated films
1940s animated short films
1940s Warner Bros. animated short films
Merrie Melodies short films
Bugs Bunny films
Elmer Fudd films
Films about old age
Fiction about God
Animated films set in the future
Films set in 2000
Films directed by Bob Clampett
Films scored by Carl Stalling
Warner Bros. Cartoons animated short films